Hendon was an ancient civil parish of around  which included Mill Hill on the border of Hertfordshire, as well as Golders Green and Childs Hill on the border of what became the County of London. In 1894 it was created an urban district of Middlesex and in 1932 it became a municipal borough. The municipal borough was abolished in 1965 and the area became part of the London Borough of Barnet.

History

Background

The name is either a Saxon-Celtic fusion meaning high down (hill) or purely Celtic meaning old down (hill). Its earliest known use is in 1005 as Heandunigna. It was in the Hundred of Gore in the county of Middlesex.

Under an Act receiving Royal Asset of Henry VIII's the parish vestry took over many manorial responsibilities.  Under Queen Victoria civil parishes in England took over secular functions, the shed religious equivalent became the ecclesiastical parish.  Heavily superseding the civil parish, an equivalent-area urban district council was founded in 1894 which merged into a rural district to the north to form a municipal borough in 1932 (reflected in the final coat of arms and its description). The parish of Edgware (previously part of the Hendon Rural District) united with the Urban District to form the Municipal Borough. The latter was abolished in 1965 and the area became part of the London Borough of Barnet.

Between 1835 and 1930 Hendon (Poor Law) Union was a poor Law Union a division mentioned among many others in most census returns. This included many otherwise non-associated parishes: Edgware, Great Stanmore, Little Stanmore, Kingsbury, Harrow on the Hill, Pinner, Willesden. It also took in the ancient parish of Hendon and all its later guises described above.

Development

There is evidence of Roman activity in Hendon, and along its western edge runs the Roman Road Watling Street. Hendon Manor was recorded in the Domesday survey of 1087 as lands belonging to Westminster Abbey. From at least the Saxon period until the 14th century most economic activity was centred on the extensive woodlands, cultivated for firewood and pigs, and an ancient route out of London, passing through Hampstead, Golders Green, and Mill Hill, (with slight variation in its course) continued to be important until the early 19th century. During the 17th century the area became famous for its hay. In 1765 the manor came into the possession of the actor David Garrick. In 1868 a station was opened on the Midland Railway, and this encouraged some suburban development in Hendon during the 1880s and 1890s. Samuel Clarke established the Pyramid and Fairy light works in Child's Hill during 1885, the first of Hendon's factories, which was joined by a number of other manufactories but it was the arrival of the trams and tubes between 1906 and 1924, that promoted the greatest growth. This was twofold as it provided not only a means of commuting for people living in the area into central London, but also provided reasonable transport for workers to come into the area. By the 1930s Hendon was a recognised industrial area of London, with companies like Schweppes, Johnson's Photographic Ltd and Handley Page the aircraft manufacturers. However much of Hendon's industry was minor engineer units, often employing fewer than twenty people. During the post war period demand for new housing pushed industry out of the area, and established the district as solely suburban in nature.

Hendon is famous as the location of Hendon Aerodrome which was established by Claude Grahame-White in 1911.

Population 1801–1961

Coat of arms
Hendon was granted a coat of arms on 24 September 1932, when it became a municipal borough. Its arms was: Azure on a mount in base vert a Pascal Lamb proper, on a chief or two windmill sails in saltire sable.
The crest was: On a wreath or and azure a two-bladed airscrew in pale, winged or. The supporters were: Dexter a griffin argent gorged with a mural crown gules and charged on the shoulder with a mullet sable; sinister a pegasus argent gorged with a mural crown gules and charged on the shoulder with an eagle displayed sable.

Districts
Hendon contained the following present-day districts:

Brent Street (Hendon)
The Burroughs (Hendon)
Childs Hill
Church End (Hendon)
Clitterhouse 
Colindale
Edgware
Golders Green
Grahame Park
Hendon Central (Hendon)
Holders Hill
Mill Hill
Parson Street (Hendon)
Temple Fortune
West Hendon

The following places were shared with other parishes:

Burnt Oak was shared with Stanmore
Cricklewood was shared with Willesden
Hampstead Garden Suburb was shared with Finchley
The Hyde was shared with Kingsbury
North End was shared with Hampstead

References

External links
Boundary Map of Hendon MB/UD
Plan of parish
Barnet Archives and Local Studies
HADAS  Archived Newsletters (The Hendon & District Archaeological Society)
Victoria County History Hendon Chapter
Pictures 1700 - 1900
Pictures 1900 - 1930 
Hendon and Finchley Times is archived from 1998 for more recent history.

History of the London Borough of Barnet
Districts abolished by the London Government Act 1963
Districts of England created by the Local Government Act 1894
History of local government in London (1889–1965)
Municipal boroughs of England
History of local government in Middlesex
Municipal Borough of